Cucumber Castle is a British comedy film starring the Bee Gees that aired on BBC2 on 26 December 1970.

History
By the time filming began in 1969, the Bee Gees were down to a trio consisting of Barry and Maurice Gibb and the drummer Colin Petersen. Robin Gibb had quit the group earlier in the year following the release of the group's sixth album Odessa. Songs for the film were recorded during the summer of 1969 with Petersen on drums, but when filming began, he was fired from the group. His scenes from the film were cut and he is not credited on the accompanying album, though he does play on some songs.

Plot
The plot revolves around two heirs, Prince Frederick (Barry Gibb) and his brother Prince Marmaduke (Maurice Gibb), and their dying father (Frankie Howerd). On his death bed, The King orders his kingdom divided into two halves, the Kingdom of Jelly and the Kingdom of Cucumbers. Before the king dies, Prince Frederick declares himself the "King of Cucumber" and Prince Marmaduke becomes the "King of Jelly". The film intersperses comedy sketches with Bee Gees songs plus performances by Lulu and Blind Faith with several cameo appearances. At the end, the king changes his mind and comes back, "I think those pills are working".

Cast
 Peter Blythe ... Narrator 
 Eleanor Bron ... Lady Margerie Pee 
 Pat Coombs ... Nurse Sarah Charles Bottom 
 Barry Gibb ... Prince Frederick, King of Cucumber 
 Maurice Gibb ... Prince Mamaduke, King of Jelly 
 Frankie Howerd ... Dying King 
 Lulu ... Lulu the cook 
 Spike Milligan ... The Court Jester 
 Julian Orchard ... Julian the Lord Chamberlaine 
 Vincent Price ... Wicked Count Voxville
 Ginger Baker ... Himself 
 Eric Clapton ... Himself (as Blind Faith) 
 Ric Grech ... Himself (as Blind Faith) 
 Steve Winwood ... Himself (as Blind Faith) 
 Roger Daltrey ... Himself (uncredited) 
 Donovan ... Himself (uncredited) 
 Marianne Faithfull ... Herself (uncredited) 
 Mick Jagger ... Himself (uncredited)

Soundtrack
"Don't Forget to Remember" by Bee Gees
"Then You Left Me" by Bee Gees
"I Was the Child" by Bee Gees
"The Lord" by Bee Gees
"My Thing" by Bee Gees
"Morning of my Life" by Lulu
"Mrs. Robinson" by Lulu
"Well All Right" by Blind Faith

Home media
The title was briefly released in the U.S. in the early days of home video by the tiny label Video Tape Network, but quickly disappeared from sale, likely due to a licensing dispute. The tape was once cited by Video Review magazine as the rarest commercial release ever, and copies have fetched three figures on the collector's market. It has never since been officially released on home video in any form, though bootlegs have circulated for years.

References

External links
 

Bee Gees
1970 television films
1970 films
British rock music films
1970 comedy films
1970s British films
British comedy television films